The Professional Cup was an international soccer tournament that took place in 1992 and involved eight, professional clubs from three different leagues in North America; the American Professional Soccer League, the Canadian Soccer League, and the National Professional Soccer League. Although it was billed as "inaugural" this would be the only year that the tournament was played.

Overview
The tournament was originally scheduled to be played as a standard two-legged, aggregate format in every round, but after all three of the non-APSL teams were eliminated in the first round it was decided that the remaining rounds would be single match ties. The winning team was to receive approximately $26,800 and the runners-up, about $13,200.

Nine matches, including the Final, were played in the United States, and two matches were played in Canada. The participating teams were APSL sides: Colorado Foxes, Fort Lauderdale Strikers, Miami Freedom, San Francisco Bay Blackhawks, and Tampa Bay Rowdies; CSL sides: Montreal Supra and Vancouver 86ers, as well as the NPSL's Chicago Power.  Although up to that point Chicago had been known only as an indoor team, in the summer of 1992 they formed an outdoor squad as well.

Colorado won the Professional Cup Final, 4–1, over Tampa Bay. The Foxes, who had already won the 1992 APSL regular season, would also go on to win the APSL title seven days later, thus completing a minor treble.

Match results

Bracket

First round

Semifinals

Professional Cup Final

1992 Professional Cup Champions: Colorado Foxes

References

External links
 1992 APSL archives
 SoccerStats.us

Soccer cup competitions in the United States
Defunct international association football competitions in North America
American Professional Soccer League
Canadian Soccer League (1987–1992)
National Professional Soccer League (1984–2001)
Defunct international club association football competitions in North America
Soccer in Colorado
1992 in American soccer